Raukawa may refer to :

 Raukaua,  plant
 Ngāti Raukawa, tribe
 Merepeka Raukawa-Tait (fl. 2000s), New Zealand activist